Recycling the Blues & Other Related Stuff is  the fifth American blues studio album by Taj Mahal. Tracks 1-7 were recorded live; tracks 8-11 are studio recordings.  The album cover shows a photograph of Taj Majal and Mississippi John Hurt taken by David Gahr backstage at the Newport Folk Festival in July 1964.

Track listing
All songs written by Taj Mahal except as noted.
 "Conch Intro" (not credited) – :30 
 "Kalimba" – 1:35 
 "Bound to Love Me Some" (Traditional) – 4:21 
 "Ricochet"  – 4:17 
 "A Free Song (Rise Up Children Shake the Devil Out of Your Soul)"  – 3:40 
 "Corinna" (Jesse Ed Davis, Taj Mahal) – 2:20 
 "Conch: Close" (not credited)  – :33 
 "Cakewalk Into Town"  – 2:32
 "Sweet Home Chicago" (Traditional; Robert Johnson) - 6:45
 "Texas Woman Blues"  - 2:55
 "Gitano Negro"  - 8:30

Personnel
 Taj Mahal - steel-bodied guitar, kalimba, banjo, conch, hand claps, upright bass 
 The Pointer Sisters - backing vocals on "Sweet Home Chicago" and "Texas Woman Blues"
 Howard Johnson - hand claps and tuba on "Cakewalk Into Town"
Technical
David Brown, George Engfer - engineer

References

1972 albums
Taj Mahal (musician) albums
Columbia Records albums